Poire belle Hélène is a dessert made from pears poached in sugar syrup and served with vanilla ice cream and chocolate syrup. It was created around 1864 by Auguste Escoffier and named after the operetta La belle Hélène by Jacques Offenbach. Simpler versions replace poached pears with canned pears and sliced almonds.

Popular culture 
In the film Pappa ante Portas by Loriot, the main character and his wife keep arguing about the ingredients of a genuine Poire belle Hélène.

References 

French desserts
Frozen desserts
Pear dishes
Vanilla ice cream